Uthman bin Ali Zayla'i (d. 1342) was a 14th-century Somali theologian and jurist from Zeila.

Biography
Zayla'i traveled extensively throughout the Muslim world during his lifetime. He eventually settled in Cairo, Egypt, where he joined other Somali students at the Riwaq al Zayla'i of the Al-Azhar University.

Uthman wrote several books on Islamic jurisprudence, one of which is considered to be the single most authoritative text on the Hanafi school of Islam. Consisting of four volumes, it is known as the Tabayin al-Haqa’iq li Sharh Kanz al-Daqa’iq. In it he narrated the saying of Abu Hanifah that the Qiblah of the people of the East is West and the Qiblah of the people of the West is East and the Qiblah of the people of the North is South and the Qiblah of the people of the South is North.

Notes

References

Hanafi fiqh scholars
Al-Azhar University alumni
1342 deaths
14th-century jurists